Knockfarrel is a village, 1 mile east of Strathpeffer, in Dingwall in Ross-shire, Scottish Highlands and is in the Scottish council area of Highland.

Knockfarrel or Knock Farrel, or indeed Knock Farril (stone fort) is a vitrified pictish Iron Age fort which lies on the knockfarrel hill, immediately to the north of the village, and which it gave its name to the village. The walk up to the fort is a popular tourist attraction.

The village once had a large enough population to have its own shinty club which then amalgamated with Strathpeffer's to create Caberfeidh in 1886.

References

External links

Populated places in Ross and Cromarty